Alan Hale (February 24, 1953 — April 23, 2016) was an American political figure who served as a Republican member of the Montana Legislature.  He was elected to House District 77 which represents the Jefferson County area. Hale gained attention when he argued that DUI laws are harmful to small business owners.

Political experience
Born in McNary, a census-designated place in Arizona, Hale was elected in 2010 to represent District 77 in the Montana House of Representatives. In 2012, however, he lost the Republican primary to Kirk Wagoner.

Death and family
Alan Hale died at his home in East Helena two months past his 63rd birthday. He and his wife Gail were the parents of five children.

Professional experience
Owner of Silver Saddle Bar and Café 
Business Manager
Logger
Miner
Truck Driver
Construction Worker

References

1953 births
2016 deaths
Republican Party members of the Montana House of Representatives
People from Jefferson County, Montana
People from Apache County, Arizona
People from Navajo County, Arizona